Edward Lowe (July 10, 1920 – October 4, 1995) was an American businessman and entrepreneur, noted for the invention of cat litter. The Small Business School described him as "building a huge business from nothing", and cites him as a textbook example of an individual who "created a product, brought it to marketplace, invented an industry and sold his business for millions".  By the time of his death, his company was worth about five hundred million dollars (or $ million today, adjusted for inflation).

Background
Edward Lowe was born on July 10, 1920, in Saint Paul, Minnesota, to Lulu and Henry E. Lowe. His family moved to Cassopolis, Michigan, where he attended high school at Cassopolis High School.
He had four children Marilyn, Kathy, Marcia, Thomas and six grandchildren Jennifer, Stephanie, Austin, Maggie, Melissa and Abby. He served in the US Navy in World War II.

Invention of cat litter
Before Lowe's invention, people kept their cats outside, using ashes, dirt or sand as cat litter when it was necessary to keep them inside. One day in January 1947, Mrs. Draper, Edward Lowe's neighbor in Cassopolis, Michigan, asked him for some sand to use as cat litter. Her sand pile was frozen so she had been using ashes but they tracked all over her house. Instead of sand, Lowe gave her some clay called Fuller's Earth, a set of clay minerals capable of absorbing their weight in water. She found it worked far better than sand or ashes. In later years he worked on developing a litter product for chimpanzee waste with Jane Goodall, but was unable to develop a successful product.

Career
In 1947, Lowe decided to sell the clay. He packaged it in  bags and called it "Kitty Litter". He suggested that a local pet store sell it for 65 cents (or $ today). The store owner refused, saying that it would not sell because sand was so much cheaper. Lowe told him to give it away free until people were willing to pay for it. Kitty Litter was a success. Lowe drove around the country selling Kitty Litter. He even cleaned boxes at cat shows so he could get a booth to demonstrate his product. He founded Edward Lowe Industries and created Tidy Cat cat box filler in 1964. In the early 1980s, he almost lost his market to Clorox, but by 1990, Edward Lowe Industries was the top producer of cat box filler.

In Lowe's later years, he decided the best way for his business to continue after his death was to hand the running over to a management team funded by venture capitalists from New York and Chicago.  The sale went through in 1990, with the company being renamed the Golden Cat Corporation; Lowe remained as an equity holder and director. The sale was later estimated by The New York Times as being $200 million (or $ million today). Following his death, Golden Cat Corporation was sold to Ralston Purina.

References

External links
 The Edward Lowe Foundation

1920 births
1995 deaths
United States Navy personnel of World War II
Businesspeople from Saint Paul, Minnesota
People from Cassopolis, Michigan
20th-century American businesspeople
20th-century American inventors